Barbie MacLaurin (born 1964) is a BAFTA and GRIERSON nominated producer and director.

Director
MacLaurin started directing on the BBC's Holiday and Airport television series'.  Thereafter, she filmed several documentaries including Final Chance to Save Tigers.  In 2008 MacLaurin was nominated for two awards for her work on Paul Merton in China. Her most recent work includes Richard E. Grant's Hotel Secrets for Sky Atlantic, The Drug Trial: Emergency at the Hospital for the BBC which was nominated for a Grierson and won Feature of the Year at the Medical Journalist Awards 2017, and The Abused, a critically acclaimed feature-length documentary for Channel 5 which was nominated for a BAFTA and won Best Documentary at the Edinburgh TV Festival 2019.

Filmography

Awards and nominations
2008: Nominated for the British Academy Television Award for Best Factual Series or Strand with Paul Sommers, Mark Chapman and Paul Merton for Paul Merton in China.
2008: Nominated for a Broadcast Award for Paul Merton in China.
2017: Winner Feature of the Year, Medical Journalist Awards for The Drug Trial: Emergency at the Hospital
2017: Nominated Best Science Documentary, Grierson Awards for The Drug Trial: Emergency at the Hospital
2018: Winner Best Science Program, Banff Awards for The Drug Trial: Emergency at the Hospital
2018: Nominated Best Documentary, Broadcast Awards for The Drug Trial: Emergency at the Hospital
2019: Winner Best Documentary, Edinburgh Festival TV Awards for The Abused
2019: Winner Best Domestic Affairs, International Broadcasters Awards for The Abused
2020: Nominated Best Documentary, Broadcast Awards for The Abused
2020: Nominated Best Single Documentary, BAFTA for The Abused

References

External links
Barbie MacLaurin official website

Barbie MacLaurin at the British Film Institute
Barbie MacLaurin at Directors UK

1963 births
Living people
People educated at Strathallan School
British television producers
British women television producers
British television directors
British women television directors